Agustín Galli (born 17 November 2004) is an Argentine footballer currently playing as a midfielder for Belgrano.

Career statistics

Club

References

2004 births
Living people
Argentine footballers
Association football forwards
Primera Nacional players
Club Atlético Belgrano footballers